The National Petition of South Korea is a political communication effort to address citizen concerns in South Korea. President Moon Jae-in opened a communication platform to communicate directly with the people under the philosophy that "the government will answer if the public asks". The National Petition is composed of a system in which the government and Blue House officials respond to the petition recommended by more than 200,000 people over 30 days.

Meaning and application 
The presidential office Blue House's petition is one of the means of direct communication that the presidential office introduced to reflect on the philosophy of state affairs that the government responds when the public asks. To celebrate the 100 days of Moon Jae-in administration on 19 August, on 17 August 2017 the 'public communication platform' was established in the Blue House Web site. A new tab called 'People's Communication Plaza' was first introduced with discussion rooms, Kookmin Newspaper High School, talent recommendation, and Hyoja-dong Photography Museum. As of 23 February 2018, more than 124,500 postings were posted, averaging 658 daily. Im Jong-seok, the Chief Presidential Secretary, said, "Like White House, we should also answer the people's petitions." It was made in support of President Moon Jae-in. The petition is classified into 17 categories: political reform, diplomacy/unification/defense, jobs, future, growth engines, farming and fishing villages, health and welfare, child care/education, low birth/aging, low birth/aging measures, administrative, petting animals, transportation/building/national land, economic democratization, human rights/equality, culture/art/sports/media, and other, and political equality among others, which are the highest among them. In addition to receiving a petition, if more than 200,000 consent were to be collected over 30 days, official answers from government officials, including ministers and senior secretaries, were allowed to be heard within 30 days. The White House's We the People is based on more than 100,000 people over a 30-day period, so the standard is rather high, but it does not require a separate subscription.

In May 2018, an analysis of all 160,000 proposed public petitions for about eight months until 13 April showed that the most talked about were "baby," "women" and "policy." The most frequent were "President," "punishment" and "policy," but the public petition served as a channel through which appeals for the socially weak are delivered, except for this, as it is commonly mentioned in the subject and contents of the petition," it said. In fact, out of more than 20 answers, 'human rights/sex equality/sector' was the most popular. Yoon Young-chan, senior secretary for public communication, said, "We have been able to examine specifically where the will of the people is," adding that the government will continue efforts to improve the quality of people's lives.

Answers

Answers 1–10 
The first answer to petition is petition for amendment of "juvenile law". On 1 September, a group assault case of the middle school student in Busan Metropolitan City occurred, and the perpetrators classified as a "criminal underage" under the age of 14 were denied criminal punishment and bought public rage. a petition to amend the "Juvenile Law" so that even a boy can be punished for committing a crime was posted on the website of the People's petition on 3 May. And More than 200,000 consent were collected so the government has come up with an official. On 25 May, Cho Kuk, senior presidential secretary for civil affairs, announced his position through the official account of the presidential office's website and SNS. "It is important to prevent crime, rather than lowering the age of criminal underage," while saying that the public request is a legitimate aspect of the request. "The problem of protection disposal and victim protection will be better if we try to concentrate for two or three years with will. And the government will keep the promise and work steadily."

The second answer came on 26 November. On 30 September, a petition was filed to abolish the abortion crime, calling it a tragedy for all, and more than 200,000 people agreed to give an official answer. Cho Kuk, senior presidential secretary for civil affairs, replied, "The right to life of a fetus is very precious, but there are side effects such as the production of illegal medical practice due to punishment-oriented policies." He stressed that the current legislation is a step that requires social discussion, saying, "All responsibilities are imposed only on women, and no responsibilities are taken on the state or the men." There were also cases in which the Constitutional Court made constitutional decisions on abortion crimes in 2012, but in February 2017, a petition was filed with the Constitutional Court to confirm whether Article 269 and Article 270 of the Criminal Law concerning abortion crimes were unconstitutional. On 11 April 2019, the Constitutional Court ruled that the penal code banning abortion in the early stages of pregnancy and punishing violations was unconstitutional. However, the court ruled that the law should be amended based on the judgment that abortion cannot be allowed in full immediately.

The third answer dealt with both opposition to Cho Doo-soon's release from prison and petition for the abolition of a system that reduces the sentence for committing a crime while under the influence of alcohol. In 2008, he was sentenced to 12 years in prison for kidnapping and sexually assaulting a third-grade elementary school girl, but was sentenced to 12 years in prison for being drunken and feeble-minded, a petition against him came up on 6 September when the time came for his release. The main point was to review and punish him with life imprisonment, which was also answered by Cho Kuk, senior presidential secretary for civil affairs, said he deeply sympathized with the anger, but that "the retrial can be claimed only for the benefit of the punished, if clear evidence is found that the convicted criminal is found to be innocent or a minor crime." The protection system was also abolished after it was ruled unconstitutional, but said additional management at the national level, such as attaching electronic anklets, could take place. On the other hand, when it was revealed that the petition against release from prison was difficult to appeal again despite much consent, a petition was made on 4 November to prevent such a case from being reduced for mental and physical reasons when committing a crime after drinking alcohol. Cho Kuk said, "The sentencing standard for sex crimes under the age of 13 is...(ellipsis)...punishment has been strengthened," he said, adding that in the case of sex crimes, the special law on punishment of sexual violence crimes has been revised, it is impossible to "be overlooked just because you eat alcohol and commit crimes." "The criminal law that reduces the sentence for committing a crime while under the influence of alcohol requires careful discussion to remove the regulation itself as it stipulates that there is not a separate clause in the criminal law, but that there is a general reduction," he added. Meanwhile, Cho Doo-soon's petition was registered on 6 September, and the number of assenters exceeded 200,000 after 63 days. In response, Cheong Wa Dae said they released the answer considering that Cho Doo-soon is a registered petition and currently the largest number of petitions before setting the criteria for the answer.

The fifth answer was a petition for the agency to come up with institutional, environmental and human support measures for trauma center, which Health and Welfare Minister Park Neung-hoo said will provide sufficient compensation and support to those institutions that are committed to the status of the center. The number of trauma patients per year is nearly 1.8 million, and the number of severe trauma patients is close to 70,000 and people and equipment are waiting around the clock due to the inability to predict the time and place. However, the current number is difficult to operate and the intensity of the work is high," he said, adding that the government will push to improve the transportation system, improve the treatment of medical staff, and strengthen the training and management of personnel. In addition, the ministry said it will allocate the budget to directly benefit the medical staff by raising the number of medical workers to an appropriate level and expanding support for labor costs. The government will set up a joint public-private task force with the Office for Government Policy Coordination to come up with comprehensive measures to improve the system of severe external injury and medical treatment and announce measures to be announced.

The sixth answer was to the petition asking the government to remove the burden of excessive certification since the law on the safety of electric and household goods is a bad law that brings small businesses to lawbreakers while imposing excessive burden on testing and certification. Chae Hee-bong, secretary for industrial policy, said, "The government deeply sympathizes with the petitioner's point that regulations related to product safety could be a big burden to small business owners," and explained that most of the problems raised by the National Assembly in December 2017 were resolved by the passage of a revision bill that exempts products with low safety concerns such as clothing, family products and jewelry. "We will work harder to come up with policies that will ensure small businesses' economic activities while protecting consumer safety," he said.

The answer to the regulation on cryptocurrency became No. 7. The petition said, "The government is imposing excessive regulations beyond the real-name system of cryptocurrency transactions and tax levying, while driving cryptocurrency into speculation and gambling unconditionally." "The government's basic policy is to prevent illegal activities and uncertainty in the virtual currency transaction process, and to actively nurture blockchain technology," said Hong Nam-ki, head of the Office for Government Policy Coordination. He also stressed that no country has recognized virtual currency as legal currency and that it is the government's natural role to crack down on and take legal action to prevent any victims. However, he did not mention the closure of the troubled bourse, only saying that the government will respond sternly to opaque operations or weak security.

The answer to the No. 8 petition is in response to a special audit into the ruling by Judge Jeong Hyung-sik. He overturned the original trial of Samsung Electronics Vice Chairman Lee Jae-yong on charges of causing losses to the National Pension Service by the merger of Samsung C&T and Cheil Industries, and handed down a suspended jail term. The public petitioned for a special audit into the ruling, saying he arbitrarily released the arrest of the criminal. New Media Secretary Chung Hye-seung was in charge of the answer, and said the Constitution stipulates that "a judge shall judge independently based on his conscience through the Constitution and the law," adding that Cheong Wa Dae has no authority to engage in trials or discipline judges on the principle of separation of powers. "Even if a judge's admission of facts, interpretation of the law or form is unfair, it is not a violation of the law," he said. "A court official is the authority of the judiciary because he or she is excluded from the inspection by the Board of Audit and Inspection." Meanwhile, he added that Cheong Wa Dae is not a troubleshooter and that he will answer difficult questions as it is his duty to communicate how the presidential office reflects the will of the people.

The answer to the No.9 petition is about 'feminism in Primary and Secondary high school education mandatory'. Yoon Yeong-chan, senior presidential secretary for public communication in charge of the answer, said, "Although the textbooks are supposed to include gender equality, they lack quantitative and quality, and there is no explicit gender equality," stressing that the breakdown of the situation should precede how real education is conducted and what the school's human rights index is. On whether or not the regular curriculum of integrated human rights education will be included, he said, "We need to conduct various studies on what content to include." "First of all, we will use the Office of Education's budget of 1.2 billion won to develop learning materials. Also, the Ministry of Gender Equality and Family and the Office of Education will work together to provide education for adult rights. We can't solve a lot of things in one second, but I want you to know that the government is looking for a step-by-step change," he said.

A petition to raise the sentence of underage sexual assault to life was answered for the 10th time after a case similar to the Cho Doo-soon case took place in Changwon City. Justice Minister Park Sang-ki said, "If someone raped a child or a teenager, they can already be punished with life imprisonment under the current law." According to the Ministry of Justice, the number of first-term prison terms for sex crimes against children and adolescents increased from 370 in 2009 to 1,304 in 2017 before and after the Cho Doo-soon case, and the proportion of prison sentences to punishment has also increased from 73 percent to 81 percent. He also explained that there were such cases in the past, but that the punishment should not be commuted in cases where people committed sexual crimes under the influence of alcohol. He also said that the 'Me Too movement' is spreading these days, and said, "If anyone has been victimized by sexual crimes, please trust the government and report the damage."

Answers 11–21 
Kim Hong-soo, secretary for education and culture, responded by tying up two petitions(Kim Bo-reum and Park Ji-woo, who belong to the national team, are disqualified from representing their selfish attitudes, and petitioned by the Korea Skating Union to root out corruption and sternly punish them / Rep. Na Kyung-won has filed a petition to dismiss him from his post as a member of the PyeongChang Organizing Committee. ) However, the answer numbers are divided into 11 and 12, respectively. The two athletes competed alongside Noh Seon-yeong in the women's team pursuit at the 2018 Winter Olympics, which was controversial after leaving behind Noh Seon-yeong in a team-oriented match and making remarks that seemed to ignore her in subsequent interviews. "As a responsible official because of the disappointment of the people at the Winter Olympics enjoyed by people around the world, I express my condolences to the people," the secretary said. "We will investigate the controversy over teamwork and the absurdity of the skating federation at the government level." "We will also examine the selection and management issues of the national team, including those of the people concerned," he said. Meanwhile, regarding Na Kyung-won, he replied, "The commission's authority is to appoint and dismiss members of the organizing committee." Na Kyung-won once caused some controversy by sending a letter to the IOC opposing the formation of a unified Korean team.

New Media Secretary Jeong Hye-seung and Kim Sun also answered the two petitions together. Topics were a petition to set the salaries of lawmakers at the minimum wage and a petition for an investigation into the alleged manipulation of comments by articles provided by Naver. Regarding the urgent need for lawmakers, Chung said it was up to lawmakers to coordinate themselves, saying, "The law on parliamentary membership and other rules concerning parliamentary memberships is decided by the law and the rules on parliamentary allowances, so it is the authority of the legislature that the government is not allowed to engage in." The blue house, meanwhile, said that it is a call for the National Assembly to take the lead in resolving the low-wage issue, interpreting it as a "demand not to oppose the minimum wage hike but to support the minimum wage increase. Regarding the petition for an investigation into allegations that Naver was involved in the scandal, which has emerged as a social issue amid widespread distrust in the media due to fake news and opinion rigging, he said, "It seems important for the investigative agency to reveal the truth quickly and thoroughly." Jeong said that the government's comment on the matter under investigation is inappropriate, adding that the current investigation is underway and Naver's consideration of ways to improve its comment policy has also been made by the public.

Answer No. 15 responded to a petition to treat traffic accidents at crosswalks in apartment complexes as serious negligence. Lee Chul-sung, the commissioner of the National Police Agency, answered the petition with a petition filed by the petitioner himself after losing his daughter. Commissioner Lee Chul-sung said he would revise the Road Traffic Act and the Traffic Accident Handling Act to punish those who caused traffic accidents in areas outside of the road, in order to ensure that they comply with the pedestrian protection obligation even in areas outside the road. He also said that he discussed countermeasures with the Ministry of Justice and the Ministry of Land, Infrastructure and Transport, and that the government will strengthen public publicity to establish a culture of traffic safety. Lastly, ‘we will work together with related government ministries and the National Assembly to do our best to prevent any more unfortunate incidents like the petition from happening again," he added.

New Media Secretary Chung Hye-seung and Justice Secretary Kim Hyung-yeon responded together to the petition for the closure of Ilbe Storehouse, an Internet site that shares false information and defies the reputation of individuals, and the petition calling for punishment of Yoon Seo-in, who portrays the victim of the Cho Doo-soon case. As for the Ilbe site, he replied that the closure is possible, but added that procedures are needed to confirm the requirements. "We have to wait and see if the percentage of Ilbe's illegal information postings reaches the criteria for closing the site," said Kim Hye-seung, secretary of the presidential office. As for Yoon Seo-in, he can be punished with libel under the Act on Promotion of Information and Communications Network Utilization and Information Protection after he states that what cartoons he publishes and draws is freedom of speech and freedom of art. However, Cheong Wa Dae said it does not conduct or direct investigation into individual cases and that the victim's intention is the most important. The cartoon was deleted about 10 minutes after it was released amid strong public criticism, and the cartoonist posted an apology to the victims and their families. In addition, " satirical cartoon, problem through a national criticism that ' self-regulation ' operation, which is helped in 10 minutes is meaningful." he added.

It was the 18th response from Cheong Wa Dae with more than 200,000 consent from Fair Trade Commission Chairman Kim Sang-jo to ask for active support for the economic democratization policies he is pushing for to implement economic justice. The answer was made by Chairman Kim Sang-jo himself, who said, "The beginning of economic democratization is Extremely rich family reform and the most important task is to bring a direct change to the lives of the people," adding that Extremely rich family reform and economic democratization will be impossible without an improvement in the relationship between the rich and the poor.

A petition calling for an investigation into the neglect and cooperation of theater groups related to the frequent sexual assault and sexual violence of the play by Lee Yoon-taek, a petition to reveal the truth about the death of actor Jang Ja-yeon, and a petition for a reinvestigation into the suicide of his sister, Park Hyung-chul, answered each of the three cases in which the investigation was resumed or was under way. In connection with Lee Yoon-taek, he said he had already been arrested and that the prosecution was about to take place, adding that the investigation was conducted "with the courage of the victims and with the power of pleading for the people" even after the period of indictment and the statute of limitations. Also, about ‘Me too’ movement that sweeps Korea society, he said ‘Twelve related ministries, including the Ministry of Gender Equality and Family and the Ministry of Culture, Sports and Tourism in charge of the fact-finding, the National Police Agency in charge of the investigation, the prevention of secondary damages and the Justice Ministry in charge of pushing for the revision of relevant laws, are forming a consultative body to share their roles, and will also come up with mid- and long-term preventive measures.’ As for Jang, he said, "The Justice Ministry selected the case as a target for a preliminary investigation and will decide whether to reinvestigate the case later," adding, "We expect to do our best to find out whether there were any problems with the investigation in the past." The minor actor said, "The National Police Agency has set up a fact-finding TF," adding, "The investigation is underway whether there were any mistakes in the investigation at the time." It also said it will develop a "standard model for investigating sexual violence victims" so that victims of sexual violence can be investigated in a stable condition and educate police officers, as well as actively notify them of any help they may receive, including the victim's public defender system. Lastly, he said the government will make more efforts to take over the responsibilities that the state or investigative agency should do to protect the socially weak from violence, adding that the government will continue to make efforts to take over the public attention sparked by the MTO movement.

Answers 22–30 
The 22nd answer was made by Eom Kyu-sook, secretary of the Women's Family, as a petition for financial support for single mothers. The purpose of the petition is to require the law to allow birth mothers to claim child support from divorced birth parents, but only 4.7 percent of them received actual support as of 2010, so the government, like Denmark, is to ask for a revision to the law requiring mandatory child support and withholding from the income of their biological parents. Eom Kyu-sook said, "We have already asked for research services on how to ensure the effectiveness of the child support system, including the petition system, although we have not been able to revise the law until now due to financial burden." It added that it plans to increase the number and size of child support to protect children's rights, and is also considering special support measures for single parents under 30. The 23rd answer is a petition on the passage of the government's constitutional revision bill to implement the pledge, a promise with the people. Jin Sung-joon, secretary for political weapons planning, answered, "We are really sorry and sorry that the already proposed constitutional amendment was not implemented at the same time as the local elections promised in 2018 due to the failure to revise the National Voting Act." He then strongly criticized the National Assembly's attitude, calling it "political strife and dereliction of duty." Still, he added that the government will make efforts to improve national sovereignty by taking advantage of the purpose of the constitutional revision.

The No. 24 answer is against tax support for Silver House, a new city in Dasan Some apartments in Dasan New Town blocked vehicles from entering the ground to prevent traffic accidents in the complex, but the height restrictions prevented delivery vehicles from entering the complex, causing conflicts between residents and delivery workers and controversy over the matter. As a countermeasure, the Ministry of Land, Infrastructure and Transport recommended the introduction of a silver-carrier service, in which elderly residents move parcels from the entrance to their homes, which drew fresh criticism in that the government pays half of the costs. The ministry later withdrew the mediation plan, but when it was registered with the People's petition and met the criteria for the answer, Minister Kim Hyun-mi responded by saying, "We will consider discussing with the courier and the residents." He also promised to increase the floor space of underground parking lots and improve the poor treatment of courier drivers so that vehicles can enter and leave apartments.

The 25th answer is GMO's duty to mark GMOs and a petition to ban the use of school meals, which continues to be a safety issue. There is no production of GMO crops for edible purposes in Korea, and only six types of soybean, corn, canola, sugar beet, alfalfa and cotton are allowed to be imported, said Lee Jin-seok, secretary for social policy. The current system requires technology to indicate that GMO products are GMO products only when GMO protein genes are detected, which claimed a complete indication of GMO products when all raw materials are GMO products. Lee Jin-seok, however, said, "There are differences on safety issues, and since the self-sufficiency rate of soybeans and corn is less than 10 percent, there is a possibility of price hikes and trade friction can occur," adding, "We should consider it carefully and comprehensively." On the opinion that GMO food should be excluded from public meals, he said, "It is not actually used as the current standard."

The answer to No. 26 came in response to a petition from Kim Hye-ae, secretary for climate and environment, for China to lodge a protest against the fine dust issue. Kim Hye-ae said that South Korea, China and Japan have been jointly conducting fine dust research for five years, adding that the results will come next month, stressing that it is still not clear that the cause of fine dust is China. For this reason, it is difficult to apply the violation of international law even if the lawsuit is filed with China," it said. She also said the government is fully aware of the seriousness of the fine dust problem, adding that it is pushing all measures in all directions.

Three responses were answered in a combination of similar personalities: the request for active protection from countries without distinction between men and women; the ban on the sale of camouflage and hidden cameras; and the petition for the forced use of nude photos by YouTuber Yang Ye-won. Police Commissioner Lee Chul-sung and Gender Equality and Family Minister Chung Hyun-baek jointly responded to the petition that more than 400,000 people ask for the protection of a nation unrelated to gender, saying, "I feel a great responsibility as a police chief," adding, "We will make extra efforts to correct the unfairness felt by women." Regarding Yang Ye-won, he also promised swift and stern handling, and said he will push to strengthen the education of police officers to prevent any secondary damage. "The government will work harder until the day comes when women feel safe and do not feel discriminated against by gender," Chung Hyun-baek said, noting that the law is being revised to root out digital sex crimes.

In response to a petition by the Park Geun-hye government for disciplinary punishment for Captain joyeo-ok, who was perjured by a hearing at the Seowal High School, Jeonghyeseung, the New Media Secretary, replied. She said the Defense Ministry had formed an investigation team to investigate eight people involved in the case for a week to answer the petition, which she said was not secured because the trial was ongoing. In response, it is difficult to decide on the disposition of Jo Yeo-ok, and we reserve judgment," she said.

Answers 31–40 
31st petition answer, a petition for the abolition of the short sale of securities companies and the demand for an investigation.

Choi Jong-ku, chairman of the Financial Services Commission, came forward as a response to the 31st petition. Ghost shares were allocated as Samsung Securities misallocated its employees on April 6. Some employees sold it, causing a sharp drop in stock prices. Choi Jong-ku said that it will have a system to check real-time transactions and that it plans to push for a revision of the law to impose fines for the recovery of unjustifiable gains as well as criminal punishment. On the abolition of the short sale system, however, he drew a line, explaining that it was not related to the accident, which involved the sale of stocks that were received in error.

32nd petition answer, a petition calling for the investigation and criminal punishment of all former and incumbent member of the National Assembly for violations of the Political Funds Act.

Chung Hye-seung, who was in charge of the answer, said in an accounting report to the National Assembly that she is already reviewing whether to violate the law based on the current Political Funds Act, and the NEC has also said it will take a closer look at the practice. However, under Improper Solicitation and Graft Act, and the Act on the Establishment and Operation of the Anti-Corruption and Civil Rights Commission, which is not the constitutional body, the National Assembly, the government has announced that it has been conducting a full investigation since May to support foreign business trips to 1,483 public institutions.

33rd and 34th petition answer, petition to save children who are being sexually harassed and petition to prevent gang violence. Min Kap-ryong, deputy chief of the National Police Agency, was in charge of the answer.

In the 33rd petition, the problem was a video clip showing a man having continuous sex with his seven-year-old daughter. Min Kap-ryong said the video was a pornographic piece produced, and promised a swift investigation, although it is difficult to relate to sexual abuse of children. He apologized for the delay in the police investigation and the lack of support for the investigation as the site where the video was uploaded has a server in the U.S.

In the 34th petition, a man was hit by a group of eight people in Gwangju, putting him on the verge of blindness, a case in which police were criticized for their passive response. Min Gap-ryong promised to "do his best to ease public anxiety" by setting up an all-out response system and strengthening the role of the 112 general situation room as a control tower to enhance police's on-site response.

35th answer. The petition to cancel the TV Chosun's general programming channel license was selected as the 35th answer. Jung Hye Seung replied that freedom of speech is an important right guaranteed by the "Korea Constitution," and that it is an issue that needs to go through strict legal procedures. Stressing that the commission is an "agreement-based administrative body where multiple members of the commission make decisions together, not a self-righteousness," it is a safety valve-like structure that requires close discussions among members of the commission to make decisions as carefully as possible, as well as the freedom of the press, "it seems like the people's desire to become a trusted media outlet as a guard to uphold social justice is revealed in the petition."

Answer No. 36 is a petition to prevent the abolition of the abandoned dog shelter. Kim Hye-ae, secretary for climate and environment, responded by asking the Dong-gu Office in Daegu to prevent the use of the dog at Hannane, near Palgongsan. Kim Hye-ae said, "The Dong-gu Office issued the order because the "Act on the Management and Use of Absorption Chloride" has been revised to allow local governments to order unauthorized and unreported livestock excrement facilities to be shut down," adding, "However, since the Ministry of Environment has released an interpretation that the protection facilities for the purpose of rescuing organic animals are not subject to the law, the order will likely be cancelled soon." He added that a certain level of regulation is needed for animal shelters to minimize damage to residents near the shelters and prevent environmental pollution.

The 37th answer is to designate a long-term soldier who suffered burns from a self-propelled artillery explosion as a national meritorious man. In August 2017, three soldiers were killed in a K9 self-propelled howitzers at a unit located in Cheorwon County, which requested support for them. Secretary for Defense Reform Kim Hyun-chong said, "We have already finished our collection and screening of our posts, and a memorial service will be held at the Memorial Garden soon," adding, "We are also providing medical assistance to the wounded, including soldiers who have been discharged from military service." It also said it submitted a bill to the National Assembly to enact the Military Accident Compensation Act, which would raise compensation for disability for soldiers by up to 100 million won.

Answer No.38. The answer to the petition against the opening of the Queer Culture Festival was 38th. "The presidential office cannot approve or ban the program," said Jeong Hye-seung, secretary of New Media. "We will replace the answer by telling the Seoul Metropolitan Government about the current situation." Regarding the participants' clothing and the sale of adult goods, the Seoul Metropolitan Government also said it will deploy police personnel to prepare for various situations, adding that the city "has gone through deliberation and concluded that there is no problem in using the plaza" under a related ordinance.

Answer No. 39 and No. 40 are answers to a petition for the enactment of a special law to punish innocent people and the suspension of an investigation manual on illegal sexual violence by the South Korean prosecution office. Park Hyung-chul, an anti-corruption secretary, replied. Park Hyung-chul, who ruled out that the South Korean court sentence was relatively high, only noted that the indictment rate and the prison rate were not high because "there is not enough evidence to prove the charges" and "the standard of imprisonment is set lower than that of the court." In response, we will severely punish even malicious innocent and first-time offenders," he added. Regarding the prosecution office, Park said, "In principle, we are asking for the suspension of the investigation into sexual crimes victims by the end of the investigation into sexual violence and the prosecution's investigation into defamation cases on the spot." However, Park Hyung-chul responded, "We put special emphasis on minimizing the risk of secondary damage."

Answers 41–50 
Answer 41. A plea for the president Moon Jae-in. The petitioner claimed that "the biggest thing the Korean people can do in this situation is to trust and support the president." The answer was taken by Yoon Young-chan, senior secretary for public communication, and he thanked President Moon, our aides and secretaries for their requests. On the other hand, thanks for a president was due originally plans to be a direct response to the Moon Jae-in, but in on the day of Roh Hoe-chan existing investment trust, and Justice Party leader.On behalf of this schedule has been cancelled, and the next day Yun Yeong-chan.

The answer No. 42 was answered by Justice Minister Park Sang-ki, asking for the abolition of the permit for refugee applications. Saying that he "severely accepts the people's concerns," Park Sang-ki said he will improve the refugee system by identifying false refugees by strengthening verification of the refugee identity, punishing refugee brokers, and establishing a new culture and refugee tribunal. However, he stressed that it is time for a realistic and reasonable refugee policy to be implemented, saying, "It is difficult to withdraw from the Convention on the Status of Refugees or abolish the Refugee Act in consideration of its international status." Answer No.43. Jung Hye-seung, head of the Digital Communication Center, answered a petition asking for the release of her husband, who was imprisoned in the Philippines, for the 40th time. Chung said the embassy in the Philippines has received a reply saying that the Philippine police will investigate the matter and that he is doing his best by conducting visits to the consulate and providing legal advice.

This is the 44th answer to the Dispatch closing request. Chung Hye-seung, head of the Digital Communication Center, said that freedom of speech is a very important right protected by the Constitution, and that it is inappropriate for the government to intervene. However, he also stressed that the petitioner's emphasis on privacy is also a basic right under Article 17 of the Constitution, and that he would like to humbly see the will of the people through a petition that seriously considers the issue of privacy infringement caused by media reports.

Answer No. 45 and No. 46. Choi Jae-kwan, secretary for farming and fishing, replied by tying together two petitions on a ban on eating of dogs and cats. On a petition to exclude dogs from livestock, Choi Jae-kwan said he would consider overhauling related regulations, saying there are aspects that are "not right for the times." Meanwhile, Rep. Pyo Chang-won of the main opposition Minjoo Party of South Korea proposed a revision to the "Animal Protection Law" similar to the petition, which supported its passage. The presidential office Cheong Wa Dae said the discussions are expected to be brisk as related bills have been proposed to the National Assembly, adding that the government will also actively participate in the necessary discussions.

The 47th and 48th answers were answered by Deputy Prime Minister for Social Affairs Kim Sang-gon, who tied a petition to toughen punishment for underage sexual offenders and repeal of the "Children Act." Regarding the "Children Act," he said that the criteria for 14 years of age, which were created in 1953, were discussed at the pan-government level to lower them to 13 years of age. Related to the sexual assault case among middle school girls, he also introduced related "proposed bills are under legislative discussion at the National Assembly," but said that since juvenile crimes are not resolved only by toughening punishment, efforts should also be made to prevent juvenile crimes and educate juvenile offenders, even if it takes time.

The 49th answer is a petition on child abuse, which was answered by Um Kyu-sook, a secretary for women's families. Eom Kyu-sook said the legal system has been supplemented to strengthen punishment since the "special law on punishment of child abuse crimes" was enacted, adding that the system needs to be supplemented to the issue of "the fact that various circumstances are taken into account during the sentencing process and that the sentence is mitigated."

The 50th answer was a demand for a special investigation into the digital sex crime industry, with National Police Agency Commissioner Min Kap-ryong as the answer. Min Kap-ryong said, "We have already set up a special investigation team at the National Police Agency and a corresponding organization at front-line police stations to actively take measures to prevent such crimes and report their victims," adding, "We are also cooperating with the National Tax Service to recover the profits from crimes." He also said that the changed atmosphere is also detected, with midnight functions working and alerting people to digital sex crimes, such as shutting down adult bulletin boards on Internet websites.

Answers 51–60 
Answer No. 51. The petition came up because it was unfair that her husband was sentenced to six months in prison for sexual harassment when he ran into another woman at a restaurant, but Chung Hye-seung, head of the Digital Communication Center, effectively avoided answering the question by saying, "It is not in line with the principle of separation of powers for Cheong Wa Dae to comment on the case under the second trial." He also added that it is difficult to answer questions about the judiciary and legislative affairs in the future, which was controversial because it contradicted the president's remarks the previous day on the review of the pardon lottery for residents of Gangjeong Village, which was related to the construction of a naval base on Jeju Island.

Answers 52 and 53 were grouped and answered together by Justice Minister Park Sang-ki. One is a petition to increase the penalty for drunk driving, and Park said that he would restrict parole by enforcing a three-strike system that calls for mandatory arrest, maximum jail sentence for drunk driving, and three or more drunk driving. The other is about revenge porn behavior, which Park Sang-ki said he ordered the prosecution to seek the maximum legal punishment and will make efforts to enforce the law strictly. "We will seek a maximum sentence for illegal film distribution and deal with it more severely than with intimidation or blackmail," he said.Answers 54 and 55 were also made. Regarding a middle school girl in Incheon who committed suicide in a group of attacks, Justice Secretary Kim Hyung-yeon said, "There is a gap between public sentiment and the underlying cause should be examined in the face of the ever-increasing number of violent crimes committed by young adults," but recalled that he had already expressed his intention to lower the standard for criminal under 13 years of age. On the other hand, he gave a fundamental answer to a petition asking that personal information such as the addresses of victims of sex crimes be not transferred to the perpetrators, saying, "Although improvement is needed, we are discussing with relevant organizations and the National Assembly and scrutinizing them."

Answer No. 57. The answer is to a petition that he could not be punished properly for insisting on a mental and physical medicine for the perpetrator in connection with the murder of an apartment in Gangseo-gu, where ex-husband murdered his divorced wife. Gender Equality and Family Minister Jin Sun-mi said, "We will come up with measures for domestic violence, acknowledging the lack of measures to protect the victims," but declined to give an immediate answer to areas related to mental and physical drugs, saying, "It is up to the judiciary to check and punish criminal cases."

Answer No. 56, 58, 59 and 60. On 11 December 2018, Kim Hyung-yeon, attorney general, answered four petitions together. All of these cases had something in common: the victim had died and the sentence had been lowered as the perpetrator was recognized to be in a state of so-called feeble-minded due to drinking. While answering the question, Kim Hyung-yeon said, "We should not allow punishment just because we were drunk," adding that efforts will continue to tighten standards in the future. He also stressed that there is a low possibility that mental and physical drugs will be recognized as the courts make decisions through stricter judgment.

Answers 61–70 
The 61st answer was to ask for help, saying the mother fell into a brain-dead state during childbirth and the baby died two days later. Health and Welfare Minister Park Neung-hoo said it is a major medical accident and that government support is possible. It also confirms the government's role in safeguarding patient safety," he said, adding that the establishment of a patient safety management system is also on track.

The 62nd answer came after members of the six-member boy band The EastLight were found to have been assaulted by their management agency's producers and others. Nam Yo-won, secretary for culture, said, "A variety of unfair cases are taking place at pop culture and arts planning companies," adding, "We will make a standard contract for pop culture and artists." The answer to the other three cases was also made on the same day by Jung Hye-seung, head of the Digital Communication Center. With the release of violent criminal Cho Doo-soon, another petition was filed against his release from prison, and Jung repeated his original stance that the Kim Sung-soo law, which restricts the monitoring of psychosomatic drugs, was passed. The issue of revising the "Children's Law" will be answered for the fifth time, and the ministry said it is pushing to revise the law that will lower the age limit for criminal minors from the previous 14 years to 13. Regarding the petition, which was belatedly made public that a female Navy officer was raped and molested by a male officer, but was acquitted, it is difficult to comment on the petition, which came up with an outrage over the ongoing trial, but said the government feels heavy responsibility for the situation in which the people's will is converging.

On 26 December 2018, three petitions were answered by Jung Hye-seung, head of the Digital Communication Center. A woman in Chuncheon City was killed, and she said she would "strictly ask for a crime" in response to a petition filed by her parents in anger. In addition, a man working at the Ilbe Reservoir secretly filmed his ex-girlfriend, saying, "Thanks to the public's interest in illegal footage, the National Assembly recently passed a bill to toughen the punishment for related digital sexual violence." Finally, a petition was filed against a case in which five men assaulted two women at a bar near Lee-soo Station. However, it later escalated into a "truth battle" and police sent three men and two women to the prosecution for questioning without detention, which Jung refused to say is the time to respect the police's conclusion.

Answer No. 69 came in response to an appeal for punishment of the perpetrator who ran into a speeding car and didn't even apologize for the deaths of his family. National Police Agency Commissioner-General Min Kap-ryong said he was trying to pass a law revision bill aimed at strengthening the punishment of speeding, revealing that he had sent the assailant into custody. On the same day, Jeong Hye-seung, head of the Digital Communication Center, replied to the two petitions concerning the opposition to an annual raise for lawmakers. "People will be well aware that the blue house cannot decide on the salary of lawmakers based on the principle of separation of the three powers," Chung said, stressing that the government should bear in mind all the people's wishes.

Answers 72–80 
Answers No. 72 and No. 73 were also made by Jung Hye-seung, head of the Digital Communication Center. Regarding the petition, which raised suspicions that China is planning to sell aluminum plants in Gwangyang city by turning them into Korean products, he said, "The domestic industry is going to produce 6μm and 10μm of Gwangyang Aluminum," adding, "Given the U.S. market share, there is a slim chance of trade problems." Meanwhile, a petition to stop the killing of a brutal dog was found to be false news and cleared of the misunderstanding.

It was the 74th time that a petition to severely punish a foster mother who abused a 15-month-old girl to death while she was on foster care was answered. "We will strengthen public intervention," said Um Kyu-sook, secretary for women's families. He also recalled that he had already submitted a bill to the National Assembly on improving employment of domestic workers.

The answer to the petition against Kakao's carpooling business was No. 75. The taxi industry has complained about difficulties with the advent of the carpooling company, and Land, Infrastructure and Transport Minister Kim Hyun-mee said the taxi industry, Kakao, and the government should gather wisdom together, referring to the launch of a social grand compromise body. Since the understanding is a sharp issue, it is also likely that the two sides will discuss it first depending on their position, but through this, the operator will make efforts to generate profits, ensure workers' lives and come up with reasonable agreements that will also satisfy users.

Answer 76 was a demand for punishment for skating coach Cho Jae-beom's alleged sexual assault. Yang Hyun-mi, the cultural secretary in charge of answering the question, said, "The government has already announced measures to root out corruption in the sports industry, including (sex) violence, and the NHRC also plans to establish a special investigation team on sports and human rights, while announcing its plan to establish an independent state monitoring system." Also, the sports community is currently having a hard time anticipating the midnight function, and he also said, "Thank you to the players who have once again encouraged me."

Answer 77 was against the HTTPS prevention policy. The main point of the petition was that the Korea Communications Commission blocked HTTPS to block access to illegal sites, which could result in monitoring and eavesdropping on opinions critical of the government. Lee Hyo-sung, chairman of the KCC, acknowledged that it had never done so in the past, saying, "We lacked efforts to win public sympathy and communicate with each other," and vowed to take all measures to become a transparent and trusted government. However, he stressed that illegal gambling sites and pornographic sites that are currently blocked are subject to the current law, and said, "We will continue to discuss the adequacy of the level of Internet regulation.

The 78th answer was a petition urging the establishment of a high-ranking government official's investigation office. Cho Kuk, senior presidential secretary for civil affairs, said, "Thank you for once again gathering your thoughts through the people's petition. Now it is time for the National Assembly to answer," he said, calling for detailed discussions at the National Assembly.

The 79th answered petition was about insisting the resignation of judges who adjudicated the case of Gyung-Nam Province governor Kim Gyung-su. Jung Hye-seung, the Head of Digital communication center, mentioned the trias politica and said that "Jurisdiction is a power separated from any other government authority, and Blue House can't and won't get involved in the right to control the personnel of the judiciary."

The 80th answered petition was about assault incident between two high school students.The attacker was sentenced to 8 months of imprisonment, 2 years of probation, and 160 hours of social labor. But victim's mom posted this petition claiming that "Because the assailant's dad and relatives are senior executives, the investigation was crude, and the trial result was weak. Also the appeal case was canceled without notification." As a reply, Jung Hye-seung, said that "It's a misunderstanding that family relation of assailant had affected the result of trial, and the appeal case was opened but the victim's side hadn't showed up on the day, so it was canceled."

Answers 81-82 
The 81st answered petition is about the case named 'Sexual violence death of Young-Gwang high school girl'. The assailants made the victim to drink 3 bottles of Soju. When she was drunken asleep, they took naked pictures of her and left her in the hotel room. The victim died due to fatal amount of excessive alcohol. Jung Hye-seung, the Head of Digital communication center, replied that "There will be a second trial under the law." and "The maneuver of our society to crimes that sexually assault victims and record them after calculatedly uses drugs and drinks to make them lose consciousness is changing. We offer great condolences to the friends who shouted out their voices and the bereaved.

The 82nd answered petition is the 'Death if coin taxi driver'. On the day of incident, the assailant took the ride of the victim, who is at the age of 70. During the ride, the assailant continuously misbehaved and insulted the driver. When they arrived to the destination, the assailant brought coin from his own car and threw it to the victim. Few minutes after the skirmish, the victim called the police and suddenly fainted yet the assailant left him on ground for 5-10 minutes before the police arrived. The victim died due to sudden stress breakdown, and the assailant has been accused of assault but not the first-degree. Blue house spokesperson, Jung Hye-seung, answered that "The prosecution is planning to minutely analyze the case and merge the accusation with the formal foul play case."

Criticism 
Regarding the following side effects and criticism of the petition, New Media Secretary Jung Hye-seung said on 30 May 2018 that it could be possible as a playground for the people. Jung stressed that the principle of "when the people ask, the government answers when the people ask" is "the government's duty of course." However, he said, "We should refrain from requesting a petition for the death penalty, abusive language, slander, false information, and eminence of certain people," and expressed his intention to carefully respond to the issue so that it has more net function than reverse function.

Neglect of representative democracy 
《The Chosun Ilbo》 cited strengthening of online publicity, including the reorganization of the presidential office's homepage and expanding video content such as Facebook, as an example of direct democracy without going through the media. It also criticized the presidential office, which has exclusive rights to information, for distributing news and videos through social media such as its website and Facebook, and for even distributing information directly. It also published critical comments from opposition parties, including Liberty Korea Party spokesman Kang Hyo-sang, People's Party spokesman Kim Yoo-jung and Bareun Party chief spokesman Park Jung-ha. The Senior Secretary for Public Communication, Yoon Young-chan sid, "It is not that we will ignore democracy, but that there is a weakness in representative democracy, so we need to communicate directly with the people in the age of one-person media." "The former president's homepage and the homepage of government ministries had all the channels for public discussion and suggestions," he said. "The current government has made it more complementary and sophisticated." "(The press) provides a lot of information, and ... "On the one hand, we have no choice but to create a platform that can unleash the people's direct needs." "In case of major messages or major policies, they will be disclosed to the media first and not to the public first," he said.

Choi Jang-jip, an honorary professor at Korea University, also cited the blue house petition for the people as a side effect of direct democracy. "There are many cases in which people are asking for issues that require deep discussion," Professor Choi said. "There is a risk that (the opinion) will be driven to a cause of excitement to skip the process of calm deliberation." In addition, Choi Chang-ryul, dean of the Graduate School of Education at Yongin University, said, "There is no concern that opinions of certain classes or groups will be excessively reflected," but also said, "It is positive in terms of actively reflecting the people's opinions."

Social conflict promotion 
It is pointed out that the heat of the petition is causing a number of problems. 16 November, came anonymous claims is "Japanese military sexual slavery in the military for soldiers to be almost mandatory military service without pay two years when introduced". This is required "The blue hose to sex trafficking brothel owners to be alive and is not different Japanese military sexual slavery old women against the act.", and that the petitioner's punishment.Nearly 80,000 people joined petition. There are petitions that cannot be made in that the judicial system should be respected, such as a petition urging the dismissal of Shin Kwang-ryol, a senior judge who accepted former Defense Minister Kim Kwan-jin's arrest. As for a petition to make it mandatory for women to serve in the military, a fight petition was filed to transplant artificial palaces to men, turning the national petition site into a "fighting ground." Some argue that the petition should be changed to a real-name system and added a function of protest against the petition. However, the blue house said that it wanted to respect the court's judgment, saying that the court judged the real-name Internet system unconstitutional and that imposing a real-name duty on all citizens to catch the few malicious comments was to treat all citizens as potential criminals. "So far, the self-purification function is working well," he said. "If we add the function of 'I' we can turn the petition board into a discussion board."

Excessive expression of opinion 
Some of the more than 50,000 petitions are said to be unnecessary. They also ask for policy and institutional suggestions such as "improving English education," "revision of the law on child leave," and "abandoning the Korean age," as well as civil complaints such as where to appeal to job scams, to ask for support for dating, to re-hire Guus Hiddink as the national football coach, or to wrap up Chinese chili powder. They say that there are many practically impossible petitions for the government to come forward directly, with fan clubs supporting idol stars becoming a battleground when they criticize or complain of unfairness and petition to dissolve the main opposition Minjoo Party in response to the main opposition Liberty Korea Party's request for the disbandment of the unconstitutional party. There is a petition asking for student human rights and the right to warm up students, a petition to guarantee girls the right to wear school uniform pants, a petition to the president not to take pictures with pretty female entertainers, and a petition to educate people around the world free of Korean for free, and a Cheong Wa Dae official pointed out that the petition has degenerated into a playground, saying, "I understand that, but the president is not the king of Joseon era." Moon Jae-in president also said "Under the current legislation, acceptance is impossible to annoying sometimes.". "But I think it's a very desirable phenomenon," he said. "I think we need a place for the people to express their opinions. Any petition that we can't resolve right now will serve as a guide to improving legislation in the long run." Cheong Wa Dae also announced that it will make efforts to revive the purpose of direct democracy, supplement its counter-function and boost its net function. Academics also assessed that it has a "symbolic meaning," with Hwang Sang-min, a psychology professor at Yonsei University, stressing that the most important thing is to be given an opportunity to talk to citizens. Meanwhile, Lee Taek-kwang, a sociology professor at Kyung Hee University, said, "It is a matter for Cheong Wa Dae to ponder in the future as to how the petition will be raised and how it will be implemented into a democracy of hangover."

However, some argue that the National Assembly's petition system, another channel for petitioning, is nominal. In fact, the number of petitions in the 16th National Assembly, which opened in 2000, has decreased from 765 to 227 in the 19th National Assembly, which opened in 2012. The number of petitions adopted is also small, meaning only two were adopted by the 19th National Assembly because the petition is not properly reviewed by the subcommittee of the petition screening committee within the standing committee even if it is received. Also, unlike Cheong Wa Dae, it is cumbersome that a parliamentary petition should be accompanied by a letter of recommendation from lawmakers.

Controversy over overlapping petitions 
There is controversy over overlapping voting through Kakao Talk. The presidential office Cheong Wa Dae's public petition, along with Facebook and Twitter and Telegram, can participate through four different social networks, including Kakao Talk, which was registered on 6 Jan. by repeatedly cutting off its connection to the "Korea's presidential office" account in the setup menu and then re-connecting it, is suspected that it did not vote for the petition registered on 6 Jan.. The petition is under suspicion for obtaining consent from more than 100,000 people two days before the deadline. In response to the controversy, Cheong Wa Dae blocked the public petition board from pressing its consent on Kakao Talk, leaving a message on its bulletin board, "We have found inappropriate logins of some users and are temporarily suspending the Kakao Talk connection among social login services." It also said it will continue monitoring in the future. Controversy over the overlapping voting has been around in the past, with some community-focused postings encouraging overlapping participation, such as "I have agreed with 12 ids" and "When I turn on my personal information protection mode on my phone, I can change my account and participate in it." In addition, some pointed out that because the method of participation in a public petition utilizes four SNS accounts, one can actually agree up to four times and Twitter can create an account indefinitely, which may "have procedural problems" in which certain public opinion is excessively represented.

Controversy over deletion of petition 
The Jeju refugee crisis occurred in June 2018 when some 500 Yemenis applied for refugee status in the Jeju Special Self-Governing Province. As the number of asylum seekers grew more than 12 times in five months at the time, a petition was posted on the Cheong Wa Dae public petition board, claiming that the government should abolish the visa and refuse to accept refugees. However, the petition, which sought the consent of 180,000 people for four days, was deleted late Wednesday, creating another problem. In particular, the issue of transparency and procedural justification of deletion was raised without explaining the reason for deletion. The presidential office Cheong Wa Dae explained two days later that it was too late to respond as many comments were posted in the near future, but it is reported that it is practically difficult to inform all petitions that are deleted. However, the petition against Kim Bo-reum, Park Ji-woo and cartoonist Yoo Seo-in also failed to quell controversy in terms of equity, given that the answer was made even though it amounted to defamation against others.

In July 2018, a petition was deleted to stop selling acetaminophen at convenience stores, and in January, a petition was filed regarding the law on forced conversion, but it was also deleted.

References 

Online petitions
Moon Jae-in Government
Politics of South Korea
Society of South Korea